A by-election was held for the New South Wales Legislative Assembly seat of Pittwater on 31 May 1986. It was triggered by the resignation of sitting Liberal MP Max Smith. The by-election was won by Liberal candidate Jim Longley.

Background 

Labor did not stand a candidate in the by-election, and as a result, this election was almost won by professional surfer and former world surfing champion Nat Young, who ran on a largely environmental ticket.

Results 

Liberal MP Max Smith resigned.

See also
Electoral results for the district of Pittwater
List of New South Wales state by-elections

Notes

References 

1986 elections in Australia
New South Wales state by-elections
1980s in New South Wales